The 58th General Assembly of Nova Scotia represented Nova Scotia from 1999 to 2003, its membership being set in the 1999 Nova Scotia election.  The Progressive Conservative Party of Nova Scotia, under John Hamm, held the most seats and thus formed the government.

Division of seats

List of members

Notes

 Russell MacLellan resigned in 2001, Cecil Clarke subsequently won the by-election.
 Don Downe resigned before an election was called.

58
1999 establishments in Nova Scotia
2003 disestablishments in Nova Scotia